The McCormick's Livery and Feed Stable Sign is a site on the National Register of Historic Places located in Townsend, Montana, United States. It was added to the Register on  July 8, 1981.  The sign is 8X15 feet on a limestone wall.  It reads "The Best in Town, McCormicks Livery and Feed Stable, Near Depot - Townsend".

References

Commercial buildings on the National Register of Historic Places in Montana
National Register of Historic Places in Broadwater County, Montana
Individual signs on the National Register of Historic Places